"The Stone-cutter" is a supposed Japanese folk-tale published by Andrew Lang in The Crimson Fairy Book (1903), taken from 's Japanische Märchen (1885). However, the story has been pointed out to closely resemble the "Japanese Stonecutter" parable in Dutch novelist Multatuli's Max Havelaar (1860), which is in turn a reworking of a story written by Wolter Robert baron van Hoëvell aka "Jeronimus".(1842)

The tale is closely related to the themes of The Fisherman and His Wife, a well known fairy tale collected by the Brothers Grimm.

In the legend, a poor stone-cutter craves to become a rich man, then a prince, and his wishes are granted in turn by a mountain spirit. He then envies becoming the sun impervious to heat, then clouds undaunted by the sun, then the mountain which withstands the rain-clouds. But when a stone-cutter starts chipping away at him, he wants to revert to being a man, and comes to the realization that he is satisfied with his station in life as a humble stone-cutter.

Textual notes 

A large-print, illustrated version "The Stonecutter" by Gerald McDermott was published in 1975.

Dutch parable 

Brauns's tale closely follows the "Japanese Stonecutter" parable in Dutch author Multatuli (Eduard Douwes Dekker)'s novel Max Havelaar (1860). It was translated into English by Baron Nahuijs in 1868.

Multatuli's parable, in turn, was an adaptation of the story written by Wolter Robert baron van Hoëvell under the pen name "Jeronimus" and published in the Tijdschrift voor Nederlandsch-Indië (1842).

Dutch author  has also published a retelling of Multatuli's story, translated into English as "And then also that Wish Came True"

Analysis

AT type 
According to the Aarne-Thompson classification system of fairy tales, The Stonecutter is of  tale type 555, "(The) Fisherman and his Wife ", represented by the corresponding Grimms"' tale.

Historical remarks 
That the tale was related to the Grimms' fairy tale The Fisherman and His Wife was remarked on by Felix Liebrecht in an 1885 review of Brauns's book.

And even before Brauns's German-translated version appeared, Charles Wycliffe Goodwin noted in 1875 that "The Japanese Stone-cutter" from the Dutch Novel was similar to the Grimms' tale.

Authentic Japanese analogues 
Goodwin also inquired as to the (Japanese) authenticity of the tale, and discovered that while no Japanese tale of the kind was in print, many versions continued to be orally told during his time. He printed one variant obtained thorough informants entitled "The Story of the Ambitious Mice" which paralleled it to a large extent: the mice attempt to marry their daughter to the sun, the cloud, the wind, and the wall, until the last potential groom complains he is vulnerable to the mice gnawing him, and they marry the daughter to her own kind. Japanese sources the legend is said to be European, and the stonecutter's name is given as Hans..

Chinese versions 

Chinese folklorist  (Ding Naitong)  who catalogued The Type Index of Chinese Folktales noted that there are Chinese tales of composite nature with components of the ATU 555 type.

Russian analogues 

Alexander Pushkin wrote the verse "The Tale of the Fisherman and the Fish", considered to be derived from Grimms' tale disseminated among the Russian populace, so it is of course another parallel.

Substantially similar to Pushikin is "The Goldfish" from Alexander Afanasyev's collection of Russian wonder-tales. It is "The Goldfish" (Guterman's translation ) which classed as AT 555 in Stith Thompson's own anthology.

"The Goldfish" has been used in comparative Poppovian analysis opposite the Grimms' tale and the Japanese Stone-cutter story.

As an Asian tale 

Some commentators (such as those from the children's education field) take the tale at face value as an Asian tale. The story of the Stonecutter is seen as a prime example of cyclical thinking in Eastern philosophy.

While the similar cumulative tale The Fisherman and His Wife is explicitly moralist in tone, The Stonecutters lesson proceeds from a more philosophical viewpoint. At the end, the stonecutter simply realises that his greedy longings are futile because power is relative (compare: food chain). The fisherman's wife however has no end to her ambition, and keeps asking for more influence; first nobleman, then queen, then empress, then pope, until at last she wants to become God. The magic fish then punishes her [ blasphemous ] greed by sending her back to her poor hut (compare "hubris" in Greek mythology.)

The Stonecutters central theme is reflected in the popular hand game paper, rock, scissors, which also has its origins in East Asia.

Explanatory notes

See also
Nontransitive game
The Husband of the Rat's Daughter

References
Citations

Bibliography

 
 ; e-text via DBNL

External links and references 
 The Japanese Stonecutter - English translation of the end of chapter 11 of Max Havelaar
 The Stonecutter - original translation by Andrew Lang from The Crimson Fairy Tale Book.
 ''Hofus the Stonecutter' - from the Riverside Third Reader (adapted)

Japanese fairy tales
Japanese folklore
ATU 500-559